Aplahoué is a town and arrondissement in Benin, and is the capital of the Kouffo Department. The commune covers an area of 572 square kilometres and as of 2013 had a population of 170,069 people.

References

Communes of Benin
Arrondissements of Benin
Populated places in the Kouffo Department